Dzhamal Usumiyevich Dibirgadzhiyev (born 2 August 1996) is a Russian footballer who plays as a striker for Veles Moscow.

Career

Club
Dibirgadzhiyev made his professional debut in the Russian Professional Football League for FC Anzhi-2 Makhachkala on 12 August 2014 in a game against FC Alania Vladikavkaz.

In August 2016, Dibirgadzhiyev moved on loan to Portuguese side Fátima for the 2016–17 season.

On 18 September 2016, he scored 6 goals for Fátima in a Campeonato de Portugal 8–0 victory against Naval.

He made his Russian Premier League debut for Anzhi on 1 October 2017 in a game against FC Zenit Saint Petersburg.

On 4 August 2020, he signed a three-year contract with Shkupi in North Macedonia.

Career statistics

Club

Notes

References

External links
 
 
 

1996 births
Footballers from Makhachkala
Living people
Avar people
Russian footballers
Association football forwards
FC Anzhi Makhachkala players
C.D. Fátima players
FC Veles Moscow players
FC Chernomorets Novorossiysk players
FK Shkupi players
FC Gorodeya players
FC Dynamo Bryansk players
FC Baltika Kaliningrad players
FC Dynamo Makhachkala players
Russian Premier League players
Russian First League players
Russian Second League players
Campeonato de Portugal (league) players
Belarusian Premier League players
Russian expatriate footballers
Expatriate footballers in Portugal
Russian expatriate sportspeople in Portugal
Expatriate footballers in North Macedonia
Russian expatriate sportspeople in North Macedonia
Expatriate footballers in Belarus
Russian expatriate sportspeople in Belarus